Adriana Barrientos Castro (born 16 April 1980) is a Chilean model.

Early career 

Barrientos began her modeling career in 2004 in morning television programme Buenos Días a Todos of Televisión Nacional de Chile with the host Felipe Camiroaga,<ref>Terra, Adriana despide el verano</ref> and in Trato Hecho hosted by Mario Kreutzberger "Don Francisco" of Canal 13.

On August 26, 2004, Barrientos participated in Miss Chile where she came the 2nd. finalist. On 6 October, the same year she participated in the Miss World Chile, is named best swimsuit. In April 2005 she traveled to Guangzhou, China, as Miss Chile to participate in the beauty contest Miss International Asia-Pacific, earning the 8th place. In 2005, Barrientos was featured in a television commercial of cream Soprole.

But it was in 2006 and due to a discussion with media model María José López, for a romance with the Chilean football soccer player Luis "Mago" Jiménez, in the show business programme Mira Quién Habla of the private television channel Mega, that she made known and she passed to be a panelist of that programme.

Transition to television
Integrates into the night show Morandé con Compañía hosted by Kike Morandé where she participated as model, dancer and actress in the sketches of comedians.

In 2009, Barrientos participated on the reality show of Canal 13 1910 resulting in one of 4 finalistsEnportada.cl, Así fue la traición a Adriana Barrientos en 1910Enportada.cl, Adriana Barrientos se perfila como finalista de 1910 and where she met her new boyfriend, Daniel Pinto.

In 2010, she was reporter and show commenter of the entertainment programme Alfombra Roja during February of that year with greater participation in covering the International Festival of the Song of Viña del Mar. In April of that year she participated in the All-Star Dance programme Fiebre de Baile III (Chilevisión), being the thirteenth eliminated.

Barrientos participated too in the revue show of comedian Ernesto Belloni also known as Ché Copete to January and February 2011 and traveled to Argentina with Nicole Moreno (Luli) where she was invited for El Trece to the programmes Soñando por Bailar: el debate and Éste es el Show where her cries shook the Argentine television audience also had a notable appearance on the Bien de Verano programme of the Argentine cable TV channel Magazine. On her return to Chile she was hired as a guest panelist of Chilevisión showbiz programme SQP.

The International Festival de la canción of Viña del Mar in 2011, Barrientos ran for "Reina del Festival" (Queen of the Festival), which won competition in last place with only 7 of 338 votes. This vote, involving only festival environmental journalists, echoed the view expressed by the public who attended the official presentation of the candidates for the scepter.Andrea Dellacasa se coronó reina del Festival Viña 2011 | Festival | Radio ADN 91.7. Adnradio.cl (2011-02-23). Retrieved on 2016-07-12.

During 2011, Barrientos had guest-starred shares featured on the programme En Su Propia Trampa of the press department of Canal 13 and in the night telenovela Peleles in the same television channel.

In October 2011, Barrientos was invited back to Argentina to the program of América TV celebrity show "Infama" and was hired by Carmen Barbieri to participate in the revue theater in his work Barbierísima during the summer of 2012, which Barrientos became the first Chilean to participate actively and regularly in a show of her kind in Argentina. She also appeared in Bailando por un Sueño 2011 hosted by Marcelo Tinelli which was criticized by Moria Casán and Cinthia Fernández for her way of speech and dance, which led her to win more screen on the Argentine television.

After leaving Barbierísima in Argentina, Barrientos returned to Chile in February 2012 to participate in the fifth season of Fiebre de Baile Chilevisión programme which reaches semifinals. In this context participates as invited to the Gala of the International Festival of the Song of Vina del Mar 2012. During this same year she was invited back to Argentina to Telefe AM morning programme, which highlighted her portfolio with a design as the flag the United Kingdom, raising criticism from some Argentine commentators. She also participated as a guest on the TVN docureality Adopta un Famoso.

Current career
In late-2011 Barrientos was signed into Carmen Barbieri's theatre show Barbierísima''. She stands as a 1st vedette in the musical magazine alongside Andrea Estévez & Claudia Albertario.

References 

Chilean female models
Chilean female dancers
Chilean people
Living people
People from Punta Arenas
Reality dancing competition contestants
1980 births
Chilean television personalities